The Last Great Wilderness is a soundtrack album by the Scottish band The Pastels, containing music from the film The Last Great Wilderness.

Overview
The music comprises mostly short and atmospheric pieces, while three of the songs ("Winter Driving," "Flora's Theme," and "Flora Again") are brief fragments of eerie vocal loops and bells. Along with a cover of Sly and the Family Stone's "Everybody Is a Star" (which had previously appeared on a Geographic label compilation in 2002), the only other track to feature a lead vocal line is "I Picked a Flower", which is credited to The Nu Forest featuring Jarvis Cocker and The Pastels.

Track listing

Personnel
 Stephen McRobbie (or Stephen Pastel) – guitar, keyboards, vocals
 Katrina Mitchell – drums, vocals, percussion, keyboards
 Bill Wells – guitar
 Colin McIlroy – guitar
 Gerard Love – guitar
 Allison Mitchell – trumpet
 Tom Crossley – vocals
 Richard Hawley – guitar
 Jarvis Cocker – vocals
 Annabel Wright – artwork

References

The Pastels albums
2003 soundtrack albums
Film soundtracks